The Lion City Cup is one of the oldest and prestigious youth tournaments in the world with its first edition dating back to 1977, organised by The Red Card and co-organised by the national footballing body Football Association of Singapore.

The 25th Lion City Cup, also known as the 25th Canon Lion City Cup due to sponsorship reasons, was held from 8 to 16 June 2013 at the Jalan Besar Stadium.

This year's edition promised more fun and excitement as big names were set to come down to Singapore to battle against the hosts' youth teams. The teams also got to tour around Singapore to better understand the nation.

Teams
The participating teams usually include other big clubs especially those based in Europe and Singapore's very own National Football Academy (NFA) boys. It served to provide greater exposure for the Baby Cubs. Six teams will compete for the prestigious trophy in this edition.

This year, the Under-15 teams of Arsenal F.C., PSV Eindhoven, Eintracht Frankfurt and Corinthians were invited to the tournament. Singapore was represented by the NFA Under-15 and Under-16 teams.

The six teams are divided into two groups of three, and the top two teams of each group will advance into the semi-finals. They will then compete for the final, and the losers of the semi-finals will play in the 3rd/4th Placing play-off while the last-placed teams in their respective groups will play in the 5th/6th Placing play-off.

  Arsenal
  Corinthians
  Eintracht Frankfurt
  NFA U-15 team
  NFA U-16 team
  PSV Eindhoven

Venue

Group stage

Group A

Group B

Knockout stage

Semi-finals

5th/6th Placing play-off

3rd/4th Placing play-off

Final

Team of the Tournament

Goalscorers

6 goals
  Léo Jaba (Corinthians)
4 goals
  Matheus (Corinthians)
3 goals
  Nils Herdt (Eintracht Frankfurt)
  Adrian Matuschewski (Arsenal)
2 goals
  Irfan Fandi (Singapore)
  Andin Addie (Singapore)
  Christopher Willock (Arsenal)
  Marvin Diehl (Eintracht Frankfurt)
  Matthias Verreth (PSV Eindhoven)
1 goal
  Rafael Mudesto (Corinthians)
  Wesley Duarte (Corinthians)
  Miullen (Corinthians)
  Fabricio Rodrigues (Corinthians)

  Leonardo dos Santos (Corinthians)
  Renan Areias (Corinthians)
  Faiq Jerfri (Arsenal)
  Harry Donovan (Arsenal)
  Ahmed Ben Diack (Arsenal)
  Tolaji Adeyinka Bola (Arsenal)
  Kasyah Nasrullah Wallace (Eintracht Frankfurt)
  Kaylen Miles Hinds (Eintracht Frankfurt)
  Volkan Egri (Eintracht Frankfurt)
  Leandro Fernandes (PSV Eindhoven)
  Karim Bannani (PSV Eindhoven)
  Lennerd Daneels (PSV Eindhoven)
  Jaell Hattu (PSV Eindhoven)
  Dante Rigo (PSV Eindhoven)
  Syukri Bashir (Singapore)
 Adam Hakeem (Singapore)
  Syafiq Irawan (Singapore)
  Lionel Tan (Singapore)

References

Lion City Cup